Richard Reda Mostafa Basha (born 7 March 2002), known as Richard Basha, is a professional footballer who plays as a forward for Swiss Promotion League club Chiasso.

Club career
Born in Verona, Italy, to an Egyptian father and Italian mother, Basha started his career with Italian giants AC Milan and Juventus. Due to his father's work, Basha relocated to South Sinai, Egypt, where he played for Sharm El Sheikh Sporting Club. He was soon scouted and signed by Egyptian top division side Al Ahly in 2016.

In 2017, Basha's father stated that he would remain in Egypt with Al Ahly, after interest from former club Juventus. Despite this, Basha did return to Italy, joining Udinese in 2018.

In August 2021, Basha joined Swiss Super League club Lugano.

International career
Basha is eligible to represent both Italy and Egypt at international level. He has represented Egypt at youth international level.

Personal life
Richard's brother, Salah, is also a footballer, and moved to Udinese from Al Ahly with him.

Career statistics

Club

Notes

References

2002 births
Living people
Footballers from Verona
Egyptian footballers
Egypt youth international footballers
Italian footballers
Egyptian people of Italian descent
Italian people of Egyptian descent
Association football forwards
Swiss 1. Liga (football) players
A.C. Milan players
Juventus F.C. players
Al Ahly SC players
Udinese Calcio players
FC Lugano players
FC Chiasso players
Egyptian expatriate footballers
Egyptian expatriate sportspeople in Switzerland
Italian expatriate footballers
Italian expatriate sportspeople in Switzerland
Expatriate footballers in Switzerland